Yitzchak Meir Rotenberg-Alter  (1799 – 10 March 1866), was the first Rebbe of the Ger Hasidic dynasty, which he founded in the town of Góra Kalwaria (known as "Ger" in Yiddish), Poland. He headed the Kupath Rabbi Meir Baal Haness Kollel Polen (Poland) Varsha (Warsaw) (Hebrew ). He was also known as The Chiddushei HaRim for his Torah writings, and was sometimes fondly called Reb Itche Meir (Yiddish) by his followers.

Early life
Alter was born in Magnuszew, Prussian Poland, in late 1799. He came from a very distinguished family of rabbis, among the most prominent in Germany and Poland. He was a descendant of Rashi and of the Tosafist, Rabbi Meir ben Baruch of Rothenburg.

He married Feigele Lipszyc, daughter of Moshe 'Halfon' Lipszyc, in 1811, and settled in Warsaw. They had fourteen children, according to most published sources, most of whom died in infancy.

Alter became known as a Talmudic gaon. At first, he was close to the rebbes of Kozhnitz, however after some years, he was drawn to Rebbe Simcha Bunim of Prshischa, whose close adherent he became. After the demise of Simcha Bunim, Alter became a disciple of Rabbi Menachem Mendel of Kotzk, also known as the Kotzker Rebbe, who was famous for his acerbic wit and Talmudic brilliance. He was soon followed by a large number of Simcha Bunim's followers. Alter and the Kotzker Rebbe eventually became brothers-in-law, when the latter married Chaya Lipszyc, the sister of Alter's wife Feigele.

In 1830 he was forced to change his name to Alter because of his support towards the Poles during the November Uprising.

Alter was temporarily succeeded as the Rebbe of the Ger hasidim by his colleague and disciple, Rabbi Chanoch Henoch of Aleksander.

One of his sons, Avraham Mordechai, and three daughters, Cyna Pesia, Leah Hudes, and Esther, survived to adulthood and married. However, by the time of Alter's death on 23 Adar 5626 (1866), only one child (Esther) remained alive.

Works
Rabbi Alter is still well known for his talmudic commentary, though he wrote on many other areas. Extant published works are:

Chiddushei HaRim on Choshen Mishpat Part 1 Part 3
Chiddushei HaRim on Torah link
Chiddushei HaRim on Bava Batra link
Chiddushei HaRim on Bava Metzia link
Chiddushei HaRim on Bava Kama link
Chiddushei HaRim on Shavuot link
Chiddushei HaRim on Gittin link
Chiddushei HaRim on Ketubot link
Chiddushei HaRim on Pirkei Avot link

Sources
Meir Einei Hagoilo, by Avrohom Yisochor Binyomin Alter and Avrohom Mordechai Alter, (1928)
Toldoth Horim, by Itshe Myer Broder of Ger.
No. 100, Elul 5727, page 80  בית יעקב, פנחס יעקב הכהן לוין

Rebbes of Ger
Polish Hasidic rabbis
19th-century Polish rabbis
1799 births
1866 deaths
People from Kozienice County